The Isingiro–Ntantamuki–Rakai Road is a road in the Central and Western Regions of Uganda, connecting the towns of Isingiro, in Isingiro District, Western Region and Rakai in Rakai District, Central Region.

Location
The road starts at Isingiro and travels in an initial southeasterly direction. It loops around the southern shores of Lake Nakivale and travels eastwards to Rugaaga, then to Katoma. At Katoma is changes course and travels southeastwards through Ndinzi Trading Centre and passes through Ntantamuki,
crossing from Isingiro District to Rakai District. The road then continues southeastwards to Nakabanga, where it begins to turn eastwards, then northwards, through Bulanga, Kibaale and Byakabanda, ending in Rakai Town on the eastern shores of Lake Kijanebalola.

Overview
The road is an important road corridor between Isingiro District and Rakai District and between the Western Region and the Central Region in Uganda. It is used by farmers from Isingiro District to bring farm produce to urban markets in Masaka City and Kampala City. Products include milk, maize and beans. The gravel-surfaced road is prone to flooding, causing hardship to residents and travelers.

Improvement to class II bitumen surface
In September 2021, the Prime Minister of Uganda, Robinah Nabbanja, publicly announced that government had plans to improving this road to class II bitumen standard, with culverts, shoulders and drainage channels. She did not give the timeline for the planned improvements, but she stated that the road would have been put on the improvement list, but those plans were interrupted by the COVID-19 pandemic. As soon as COVID-19 comes under control, this road goes back on the improvement list, according to the government official.

See also
 List of roads in Uganda
 Masaka–Bukakata Road

References

External links
Website of Uganda National Roads Authority

Roads in Uganda
Isingiro District
Rakai District